Walter Terry McBrayer (September 1, 1937 – October 11, 2020) was an American lobbyist, attorney, and Democratic politician.

McBrayer was born in Ironton, Ohio. He lived in Greenup, Kentucky and was the senior partner and lead lobbyist for the influential McBrayer, McGinnis, Leslie & Kirkland law firm. He was a graduate of Morehead State University and Louis D. Brandeis School of Law at the University of Louisville.

McBrayer served in the Kentucky House of Representatives, representing Kentucky's 98th legislative district (Greenup County), from 1966 until his retirement in 1976. During his tenure, McBrayer was elected Speaker Pro-Tempore (1968–1969) and Majority Floor Leader (1970–1972). He was an unsuccessful candidate for governor in 1979, losing in the Democratic primary after a third-place finish (26% of the vote) in a nine-way race to John Y. Brown, Jr. (the nominee and eventual winner of the general election) and Harvey Sloane.

McBrayer served as President Clinton's Authorized Representative for Kentucky during the 1992 and 1996 campaigns. In 1995, McBrayer was elected chairman of the Kentucky Democratic Party and was a committeeman for the Democratic National Committee.

McBrayer died on October 11, 2020, in Lexington, Kentucky, aged 83 of cancer.

References

1937 births
2020 deaths
20th-century American politicians
American lobbyists
Deaths from cancer in Kentucky
Kentucky lawyers
Democratic Party members of the Kentucky House of Representatives
People from Greenup County, Kentucky
People from Ironton, Ohio
Morehead State University alumni
University of Louisville alumni